Real G4 Life (Real Gangster For Life) is a series of reggaeton albums by Puerto Rican rapper Ñengo Flow. Distributed by Millones Records, the first álbum in the series Real G4 Life was released on January 5, 2011. It featured collaborations with Jory, De La Ghetto & Gotay "El Auténtiko".

The second album in the series Real G4 Life 2 was released on January 7, 2012.

It featured collaborations with Arcángel, Tego Calderon, Yomo, Voltio, Gotay "El Autentiko", and Delirious.

The third álbum is of in the series Real G4 Life 2.5 was released on October 23, 2012. It featured collaborations with Alexis, Zion, J Alvarez, Gotay "El Autentiko", Jory, Yomo and Jenay.

Real G4 Life 2 peaked at number 75 on the Billboard Top Latin Albums chart while the 2.5 edition peaked at number 61 on the same chart.

Track listing

Real G4 Life 2 (2012)

The second volume in the series was released on January 7, 2012.

Real G4 Life 2.5 (2012)

The second and a half volume in the series was released on October 23, 2012.

Remixes

Chart performance

Real G4 Life 2

Real G4 Life 2.5

Notes
 A In these territories, Real G4 Life 2.5 was combined with the original chart entry for Real G4 Life 2, and thus re-entered the chart as one release.

References

Reggaeton albums
2011 albums
2012 albums